The 7th Magritte Awards ceremony, presented by the Académie André Delvaux, honored the best films of 2016 in Belgium and took place on 4 February 2017 at the Square in the historic site of Mont des Arts, Brussels, beginning at 8:00 p.m. CET. During the ceremony, the Académie André Delvaux presented Magritte Awards in 22 categories. The ceremony was televised in Belgium by BeTV. Actress Virginie Efira presided the ceremony, while Anne-Pascale Clairembourg hosted the show for the first time.

The nominees for the 7th Magritte Awards were announced on January 10, 2017. Films with the most nominations were The First, the Last and Keeper with eight, followed by Death by Death and Parasol with seven. The winners were announced during the awards ceremony on February 4, 2017. The First, the Last won five awards, including Best Film and Best Director for Bouli Lanners. Other multiple winners were Keeper with three awards, and Death by Death, Parasol, and The Red Turtle with two.

Winners and nominees

Best Film
 The First, the Last (Les Premiers, les Derniers) After Love (L'Économie du couple)
 Death by Death (Je me tue à le dire)
 Keeper
 Parasol

Best Director
 Bouli Lanners – The First, the Last (Les Premiers, les Derniers) Joachim Lafosse – After Love (L'Économie du couple)
 Valéry Rosier – Parasol
 Xavier Seron – Death by Death (Je me tue à le dire)

Best Actor
 Jean-Jacques Rausin –  Death by Death (Je me tue à le dire) Aboubakr Bensaihi – Black
 François Damiens – Les Cowboys
 Bouli Lanners – The First, the Last (Les Premiers, les Derniers)

Best Actress
 Virginie Efira – In Bed with Victoria (Victoria) Astrid Whettnall – Road to Istanbul (La Route d'Istanbul) Jo Deseure – Man Overboard (Un homme à la mer)
 Marie Gillain – Mirage of Love (Mirage d'amour)

Best Supporting Actor
 David Murgia – The First, the Last (Les Premiers, les Derniers) Laurent Capelluto – I Am a Soldier (Je suis un soldat)
 Charlie Dupont – Odd Job (Un petit boulot)
 Sam Louwyck – Keeper

Best Supporting Actress
 Catherine Salée – Keeper
 Anne Coesens – Jailbirds (La Taularde)
 Virginie Efira – Elle
 Julienne Goeffers – Parasol

Most Promising Actor
 Yoann Blanc – Man Overboard (Un homme à la mer)
 Lazare Gousseau – Baden Baden
 Martin Nissen – Welcome Home
 Pierre Olivier – Nous quatre

Most Promising Actress
 Salomé Richard – Baden Baden
 Martha Canga Antonio – Black
 Ghalia Benali – As I Open My Eyes (À peine j'ouvre les yeux)
 Jade Soentjens and Margaux Soentjens – After Love (L'Économie du couple)

Best Screenplay
 Death by Death (Je me tue à le dire) – Xavier Seron After Love (L'Économie du couple) – Joachim Lafosse
 The First, the Last (Les Premiers, les Derniers) – Bouli Lanners
 Keeper – Guillaume Senez and David Lambert

Best First Feature Film
 Keeper
 Death by Death (Je me tue à le dire)
 Parasol

Best Flemish Film
 Belgica
 Black
 The Land of the Enlightened
 Problemski Hotel

Best Foreign Film in Coproduction
 The Red Turtle (La Tortue rouge) As I Open My Eyes (À peine j'ouvre les yeux)
 Eternity (Éternité)
 Les Cowboys

Best Cinematography
 Parasol – Olivier Boonjing The Dancer (La Danseuse) – Benoît Debie
 Evolution – Manuel Dacosse
 The First, the Last (Les Premiers, les Derniers) – Jean-Paul De Zaeytijd

Best Production Design
 The First, the Last (Les Premiers, les Derniers) – Paul Rouschop Eternity (Éternité) – Véronique Sacrez
 Keeper – Florin Dima

Best Costume Design
 The First, the Last (Les Premiers, les Derniers) – Elise Ancion Baden Baden – Sandra Campisi
 Black – Nina Caspari

Best Original Score
 Parasol – Cyrille de Haes and Manuel Roland Black – Hannes De Maeyer
 Rising Voices (Le Chant des hommes) – Catherine Graindorge

Best Sound
 The Red Turtle (La Tortue rouge) – Nils Fauth and Peter Soldan Death by Death (Je me tue à le dire) – Arnaud Calvar, Julien Mizac, and Philippe Charbonnel
 Keeper – Virginie Messiaen and Franco Piscopo

Best Editing
 Keeper – Julie Brenta Death by Death (Je me tue à le dire) – Julie Naas
 Parasol – Nicolas Rumpl

Best Live Action Short Film
 The Plumber (Le Plombier) Lovers (Les Amoureuses)
 Snatched (A l'arraché)

Best Animated Short Film
 Pornography
 Summer (Estate)
 Totems

Best Documentary Film
 Into Battle (En bataille)
 Abandoned Land (La Terre abandonnée)
 Intégration Inch'Allah

Honorary Magritte Award
 André Dussollier

Films with multiple nominations and awards

The following twelve films received multiple nominations.

 Eight: The First, the Last, Keeper
 Seven: Death by Death, Parasol
 Five: Black
 Four: After Love
 Three: Baden Baden
 Two: As I Open My Eyes, Eternity, Les Cowboys, Man Overboard, The Red Turtle

The following five films received multiple awards.
 Five: The First, the Last
 Three: Keeper
 Two: Death by Death, Parasol and The Red Turtle

See also

 42nd César Awards
 22nd Lumières Awards
 2016 in film

References

External links
 
 

2017
2016 film awards
2017 in Brussels